Gulcher Records is an independent record label founded in Bloomington, Indiana by Bob Richert in the mid-1970s, as one of the earliest small independent labels and fanzines in the area. They have released music for acts such as John Cougar Mellencamp, The Gizmos, Kurt Vile, Dancing Cigarettes, Magik Markers, Dow Jones and the Industrials, MX-80,  Hypocrite in a Hippy Crypt, Home Blitz, and Handglops. The label's releases have been reviewed in media publications such as Rolling Stone, Spin, and Pitchfork Media.

The label is currently in Orlando, Florida.

See also
 List of record labels

External links
 Official Gulcher Site.
 

American independent record labels
Indie rock record labels
Alternative rock record labels